Nicolae Stanciu may refer to:

Nicolae Stanciu (footballer, born 1973), Romanian footballer who spent most of his career playing for FC Rapid București
Nicolae Stanciu (footballer, born 1993), Romanian footballer who plays for Al-Ahli Saudi FC